Otto Berg (23 November 1873 – 1939) was a German scientist. He is one of the scientists credited with discovering rhenium, the last element to be discovered having a stable isotope.

Rhenium
In 1925 in Germany, Walter Noddack, Ida Tacke, and Otto Berg reported that they detected the element in platinum ore and in the mineral columbite. They also found rhenium in gadolinite and molybdenite. 
In 1928 they were able to extract 1 gram of the element by processing 660 kg of molybdenite. In 2020 a memorial medal of the discovery was issued by ISTR (art-designer: Igor Petrov), the  https://www.pinterest.ru/pin/747879081861611384/.

Technetium
The same team was also involved in the discovery of technetium.  They reported the discovery of element 75 and element 43 in 1925 and named element 43 masurium (after Masuria in eastern Prussia, now in Poland, the region where Walter Noddack's family originated).  The group bombarded columbite with a beam of electrons and deduced element 43 was present by examining X-ray diffraction spectrograms. The wavelength of the X-rays produced is related to the atomic number by a formula derived by Henry Moseley in 1913.  The team claimed to detect a faint X-ray signal at a wavelength produced by element 43. Contemporary experimenters could not replicate the discovery, and it was dismissed as an error for many years.

In 1998, John T. Armstrong of the National Institute of Standards and Technology performed computer simulations of the 1925 experiments and obtained results quite similar to those reported by the Noddack team. He claimed that this was further supported by work published by David Curtis of the Los Alamos National Laboratory measuring the (tiny) natural occurrence of technetium. Noddack's experimental results have never been reproduced, and they were unable to isolate any element 43. Debate still exists as to whether the 1925 team discovered element 43. Discovery of element 43 was finally confirmed by a 1937 experiment in Sicily.

References

1873 births
1939 deaths
Discoverers of chemical elements
20th-century German chemists